Damjan Shishkovski (born 18 March 1995) is a Macedonian professional footballer who plays for Cypriot club Doxa and North Macedonia national football team, as a goalkeeper.

References

External links
 

1995 births
Living people
Association football goalkeepers
Macedonian footballers
North Macedonia youth international footballers
North Macedonia under-21 international footballers
North Macedonia international footballers
FK Rabotnički players
K.A.A. Gent players
FC Lahti players
Rovaniemen Palloseura players
Macedonian First Football League players
Veikkausliiga players
UEFA Euro 2020 players
Macedonian expatriate footballers
Macedonian expatriate sportspeople in Belgium
Expatriate footballers in Belgium
Macedonian expatriate sportspeople in Finland
Expatriate footballers in Finland